Eyes of the Underworld may refer to:
 Eyes of the Underworld (1942 film), an American film noir crime film
 Eyes of the Underworld (1929 film), an American crime film